MacGyver the Lizard (hatched July 4, 2012) is an Argentine red tegu lizard and Internet celebrity known for his intelligence, friendly personality, and large jowls.  MacGyver has been described as "a good ambassador of the giant lizard world" for his docile and apparently affectionate behavior.

Background 

MacGyver was hatched at Ty Park's lizard farm in Punta Gorda, Florida, on July 4, 2012.  He became an Internet sensation later that year when his first viral video, a montage of short clips, appeared on YouTube and received hundreds of thousands of views in the time span of a few weeks.   Since the age of three weeks, he has starred in numerous videos in which he appears to come when his owners call his name.  He is also regularly seen eating his favorite foods: salmon, eggs, cherries, and grapes, as well as cuddling with his owners.

Fandom 

MacGyver's videos have received tens of millions of combined video views across YouTube, Facebook, and Instagram. As a result, he has amassed a social media following in the hundreds of thousands since first appearing on YouTube in 2012, and inspired a fan art hashtag on Instagram that contains pencil sketches, watercolor paintings, photoshops, and various other fan-created works depicting the large red lizard. In July 2016, a fan meetup with MacGyver was held at the San Diego Reptile Supershow.

International media coverage 

MacGyver has received international coverage from a variety of publications such as Vice Media, BuzzFeed, Business Insider, the New York Post, Rare, The Daily Telegraph, Stern, and as far away as China Times and Okezone.com.

On September 7, 2016, AJ+ released a two-minute video about MacGyver and his owners, receiving millions of views on Facebook.

On September 11, 2016 The Post featured MacGyver for their weekly Pet Instagram Review, making him the first reptile to be featured for the segment.

Television appearances 
 Oct. 9, 2013: ABC Channel 10 WPBF News 
 Sept. 9, 2016: Right This Minute 
 Dec. 6, 2016: KGTV 10 News

Snoop Dogg exchange 
In August 2016, rapper Snoop Dogg posted a remixed video of MacGyver to his Instagram account which poked fun at him and his owners. MacGyver's owners responded on Facebook, joking that “It appears that Snoop Dogg is trying to get even with me for illegally downloading "Gin and Juice" over 15 years ago – talk about a grudge.”

References

External links

2012 animal births
Animals on the Internet
American Internet celebrities
Lizards in popular culture
Individual lizards
Internet memes
Reptiles as pets
YouTube channels
Individual animals in the United States